The 2020–21 Sport Lisboa e Benfica season was the club's 117th season in existence and its 87th consecutive season in the top flight of Portuguese football. This season, Benfica invested €105 million amid the COVID-19 pandemic, a record investment in Portuguese football. Domestically, Benfica lost the Supertaça Cândido de Oliveira match, were eliminated in the semi-finals of the Taça da Liga, finished third in the Primeira Liga – their worst league position since 2008–09 – and lost a Taça de Portugal final for a second time in a row. Internationally, Benfica were eliminated in the UEFA Champions League third qualifying round and in the round of 32 of the UEFA Europa League, respectively. The season started on 18 September 2020 and concluded on 23 May 2021. Considered a failed, disastrous season, it was the first time Benfica ended trophyless since 2012–13.

Players

First-team squad

Transfers

In

Out

Pre-season friendlies

Non-televised friendlies, at Benfica Campus:
 Benfica 4–0 Benfica B/U23 (15 August)
 Benfica 4–1 Estoril (22 August)
 Benfica 4–0 Belenenses SAD (25 August)
 Benfica 5–1 Farense (26 August)
 Benfica 3–0 Benfica B (6 September)

Competitions

Overview

Primeira Liga

League table

Results summary

Results by round

Matches
The league fixtures were announced on 28 August 2020.

Taça de Portugal

Taça da Liga

Supertaça Cândido de Oliveira

UEFA Champions League

Qualifying phase
The draw for the third qualifying round was held on 31 August 2020, 12:00 CEST.

UEFA Europa League

Group stage

The group stage draw was held on 2 October 2020.

Knockout phase

Round of 32
The draw for the round of 32 was held on 14 December 2020.

Statistics

Appearances and goals

|-
! colspan=18 style=background:#dcdcdc; text-align:center|Goalkeepers

|-
! colspan=18 style=background:#dcdcdc; text-align:center|Defenders

|-
! colspan=18 style=background:#dcdcdc; text-align:center|Midfielders

|-
! colspan=18 style=background:#dcdcdc; text-align:center|Forwards

|-
! colspan=18 style=background:#dcdcdc; text-align:center|Players who made an appearance and/or had a squad number but left the team

|}

Notes

References

S.L. Benfica seasons
Benfica
Benfica
Benfica